Undersåker is a locality situated in Åre Municipality, Jämtland County, Sweden with 438 inhabitants in 2010.

References 

Populated places in Åre Municipality
Jämtland